Pont-Saint-Martin may refer to the following places:

 Pont-Saint-Martin, Aosta Valley, a commune in the Aosta Valley, Italy
 Pont-Saint-Martin, Loire-Atlantique, a commune in the Loire-Atlantique department, France

It may also refer to the Roman bridge: Pont-Saint-Martin (Bridge)